Jurgen Van Goolen (born 28 November 1980 in Leuven, Flanders), is a Belgian former professional road bicycle racer.

He rode the Vuelta a España eight times, and the Giro d'Italia two times during his career, serving mostly as a domestique. On five occasions, he was part of the Belgian squad for the World Road Race Championships. Although Van Goolen was considered a big talent as a youngster, winning the award for Best Young Belgian Rider in 2000, his professional career never really lived up to these promises. In January 2014, he announced his retirement.

Major results

2000
 1st  National Under-23 Time Trial Championships
 1st GP Wielerrevue
 1st U23 Liège–Bastogne–Liège
 1st overall GP Tell
1st Stage 2

2001
 1st  National Under-23 Time Trial Championships
 3rd Zesbergenprijs Harelbeke
 5th Hasselt–Spa–Hasselt

2003
 2nd National Road Race Championships
 2nd overall Danmark Rundt
 5th overall Tour de Wallonie
 10th overall Three Days of De Panne

2004
 3rd overall Tour de l'Ain
 10th overall Four Days of Dunkirk
 10th overall Tour of Belgium

2006
 9th overall Tour of Austria

2007
 9th overall Tour of Austria

2008
 4th Gran Premio Nobili Rubinetterie
 9th overall Tour de Wallonie

2011
 1st Stage 3 Route du Sud
 3rd Druivenkoers Overijse
 7th overall Tour de Luxembourg

2013
 2nd Druivenkoers Overijse
 6th Grote Prijs Jef Scherens

References

External links

Living people
1980 births
Belgian male cyclists
Sportspeople from Leuven
Cyclists from Flemish Brabant